Persianovka is a rural locality (a khutor) in Bolshekrepinskoye Rural Settlement of Rodionovo-Nesvetaysky District, the Rostov Oblast, Russia. Population:

References 

Rural localities in Rostov Oblast